ORG-2058, also known as 16α-ethyl-21-hydroxy-19-norprogesterone, is a progestin of the 19-norprogesterone group which was never marketed. It has high affinity for the progesterone receptor (775% of that of progesterone) and has been used in scientific research to study the role of the progesterone receptor in the body. The drug has no affinity for the estrogen receptor or the glucocorticoid receptor (less than 0.2% of the affinities of estradiol and dexamethasone, respectively) and has slight affinity for the mineralocorticoid receptor, but less than that of progesterone.

See also
 Promegestone

References

Abandoned drugs
Primary alcohols
Diketones
Norpregnanes
Progestogens